The Atayal, also known as the Tayal and the Tayan, are a Taiwanese indigenous people. The Atayal people number around 90,000, approximately 15.9% of Taiwan's total indigenous population, making them the third-largest indigenous group. The preferred endonym is "Tayal", although the Taiwanese government officially recognizes them as "Atayal".

Etymology

Origins

The first record of Atayal inhabitance is found near the upper reaches of the Zhuoshui River. During the late 17th century, they crossed the Central Mountain Ranges into the wilderness of the east. They then settled in the Liwu River valley. Seventy-nine Atayal villages can be found here.

Genetics
Taiwan is home of a number of Austronesian indigenous groups since before 4,000 BC.  However, genetic analysis suggests that the different peoples may have different ancestral source populations originating in mainland Asia, and developed in isolation from each other.  The Atayal people are believed to have migrated to Taiwan from Southern China or Southeast Asia. Genetic studies have also found similarities between the Atayal and other people in the Philippines and Thailand, and to a lesser extent with south China and Vietnam. The Atayal are genetically distinct from the Amis people who are the largest indigenous group in Taiwan, as well as from the Han people, suggesting little mingling between these people. Studies on Mitochondrial DNA (mtDNA) polymorphisms suggest ancient migrations of two lineages of the various peoples into Taiwan approximately 11,000-26,000 years ago.

Recent DNA studies show that the Lapita people and modern Polynesians have a common ancestry with the Atayal and the Kankanaey people of the northern Philippines.

The Atayal are visibly different from the Han Chinese of Taiwan. Intermarriage with Chinese also produced a significant number of Atayal-Chinese mixed offspring and celebrities such as Vivian Hsu, Vic Zhou, Yuming Lai, Kao Chin Su-mei.

Folklore
According to stories told by their elders, the first Atayal ancestors appeared when a stone, Pinspkan, cracked apart. There were three people, but one decided to go back into the stone. One man and one woman who lived together for a very long time and loved each other very much. But the boy was shy and wouldn't dare approach her. Whereupon, the girl came up with an idea. She left her home and found some coal with which to blacken her face so she could pose as a different girl.

After several days, she crept back into their home and the boy mistook her for another girl and they lived happily together. Not long after, the couple bore children, fulfilling their mission of procreating the next generation. The Atayal custom of face tattooing may have come from the girl blackening her face in the story.

Culture

Lifestyle

The Atayal people have a distinct culture. They traditionally lived by fishing, hunting, gathering, and growing crops on burned-off mountain fields. The Atayal also traditionally practice crafts such as weaving, net knotting, and woodworking. They also have culturally specific musical instruments and dances.

The Atayal were known as skilled warriors. In a practice illegal since the Japanese Colonial Era (1895 –1945), for a man to earn his facial tattoo, he  had to bring back at least one human head; these heads, or skulls, were highly honored, given food and drink, and expected to bring good harvests to the fields. (See Headhunting.) The Atayal are also known for the case of the Wushe Incident, in which the Atayal participated in an uprising against colonial Japanese forces.

Lalaw Behuw is a weapon used by the Atayals. Traditional Aboriginal weapons have featured in movies.

Traditional dress

The Atayal are proficient weavers, incorporating symbolic patterns and designs on their traditional dress. The features are mainly of geometric style, and the colors are bright and dazzling. Most of the designs are argyles and horizontal lines. In Atayal culture, the horizontal lines represent the rainbow bridge which leads the dead to where the ancestors' spirits live. Argyles, on the other hand, represent ancestors' eyes protecting the Atayal. The favorite color of this culture is red because it represents blood and power.

Facial tattoos

The Atayal people are also known for using facial tattooing and teeth filing in coming-of-age initiation rituals.  The facial tattoo, in Squliq Tayal, is called ptasan. In the past both men and women had to show that they had performed a major task associated with adulthood before their faces could be tattooed. For a man, he had to take the head of an enemy, showing his valor as a hunter to protect and provide for his people, while women had to be able to weave cloth. A girl would learn to weave when she was about ten or twelve, and she had to master the skill in order to earn her tattoo. Only those with tattoos could marry, and, after death, only those with tattoos could cross the hongu utux, or spirit bridge (the rainbow) to the hereafter.

Male tattooing is relatively simple, with only two bands down the forehead and chin. Once a male came of age he would have his forehead tattooed; after fathering a child, his bottom chin was tattooed. For the female, tattooing was done on the cheek, typically from the ears across both cheeks to the lips forming a V shape. While tattooing on a man is relatively quick, on a female it may take up to ten hours.

Tattooing was performed only by female tattooists. The tattooing was performed using a group of needles lashed to a stick called atok tapped into the skin using a hammer called totsin. Black ash would then be rubbed into the skin to create the tattoo.  Healing could take up to a month.

The Japanese banned the practice of tattooing in 1930 because of its association with headhunting. With the introduction of Christianity, the practice declined, and tattoos were only seen on the elderly. However, some young people in recent years have attempted to revive the practice. By 2018 only one tattooed elder survived, Lawa Piheg, who was tattooed when she was 8. Lawa Piheg died on 14 September 2019.

Atayal in modern times

The Atayal people in Taiwan live in central and northern Taiwan. The northernmost village is in Ulay District (Wulai in Chinese), about 25 kilometers south of Taipei. The Atayal Tribe The community of Smangus in Jianshi Township had become well known as a tourist destination, and an experiment in communalism.

Many Atayal are bilingual, but the Atayal language still remains in active use.

Notable Atayal people
 Esther Huang, actress and singer
 Jane Huang, singer of rock duo Y2J
 Joanne Tseng, actress and member of pop duo Sweety
 Kao Chin Su-mei, actress, singer and politician
 Landy Wen, singer
 Lo Chih-an, football player
 Lo Chih-en, football player
 Payen Talu, member of Legislative Yuan (1996–2002)
 Vic Chou, actor and member of pop group F4
 Vivian Hsu, actress
 Yuming Lai, singer of rock duo Y2J

See also
 Atayal Life Museum
 Atayal Resort
 Wulai Atayal Museum
 Taiwanese indigenous peoples

References

 
Headhunting